Xylotrechus gemellus is a species of beetle in the family Cerambycidae. It was described by Casey in 1893 from a single specimen from Indiana, which remains the only specimen in existence, and the species is presumed to be extinct.

References

Extinct insects since 1500
Extinct animals of the United States
Xylotrechus
Beetles described in 1893